Moraggedub or Mormaketupu also called Isla Maquina is a densely populated island in the San Blas Archipelago, a group of islands off the coast of northeast Panama specifically in the Guna Yala Region. The island is part of the municipality or corregimiento of Narganá.

Etymology
Its island's name translates to Mola-making island, since its residents are known in creating hand-made textiles that is the traditional clothing of the native Guna people.

Demographics
According to the census conducted in 2010, the island has a population of 433. There are 56 houses in Mormaquetupu and the average people living per house is 7.73. With a very small land area, this makes the island one of the most densely populated islands in the world.

See also
 List of islands by population density

References 

Populated places in Guna Yala
Caribbean islands of Panama